The Atlantic and Pacific Highway was an auto trail in the United States, essentially eliminated by the U.S. Highway system in the late 1920s. It connected New York City on the Atlantic Ocean with Los Angeles on the Pacific Ocean.

Routing
Using the present road names, the highway approximately used the following route:
U.S. Route 1, New York to Philadelphia
U.S. Route 13, Philadelphia to Wilmington
U.S. Route 40, Wilmington to Baltimore
U.S. Route 1, Baltimore to Washington
U.S. Route 29 and State Route 229, Washington to Culpeper
U.S. Route 15 and State Route 231, Culpeper to Charlottesville
U.S. Route 250, Charlottesville to Staunton
State Route 42, State Route 39, and U.S. Route 220, Staunton to Covington
U.S. Route 60, Covington to Lewisburg
WV Route 63 and WV Route 3, Lewisburg to Beckley
WV Route 16, Beckley to Kanawha Falls
U.S. Route 60, Kanawha Falls to Huntington
U.S. Route 52, Huntington to Cincinnati
State Road 56, State Road 64, and Illinois Route 15, Bedford to St. Louis
U.S. Route 50, St. Louis to Jefferson City
U.S. Route 54, Jefferson City to Vaughn
U.S. Route 60, Interstate 10, and California State Route 60, Vaughn to Los Angeles

References
Rand McNally Auto Road Atlas, 1926, accessed via the Broer Map Library: shows the route in and west of Kansas, in St. Louis, and in the Mid-Atlantic States
Charleston Gazette, Charleston to Receive 1925 Tourists, February 1, 1925: lists a number of the cities the highway serves
Charleston Gazette, Tourists Are Discovering West Virginia's Scenery, June 3, 1927: describes the route in West Virginia

Auto trails in the United States
U.S. Route 1
U.S. Route 13
U.S. Route 40
U.S. Route 29
U.S. Route 15
U.S. Route 250
U.S. Route 60
U.S. Route 52
U.S. Route 50
U.S. Route 54
Interstate 10